Repulsion is an American grindcore band from Flint, Michigan, founded in 1984.

History
Matt Olivo and Scott Carlson, with bassist Sean MacDonald, formed Tempter in 1984, a metal act covering Bay Area thrash metal bands, such as Slayer and Metallica. The group's sound became increasingly infused with hardcore punk when Phil Hines, of Flint hardcore punk band Dissonance, joined as a drummer. They juggled band names, first renaming themselves Ultraviolence and then Genocide before recording their first demo in 1984. In spite of their growing popularity in the underground Genocide struggled to survive and faced difficulty maintaining a consistent lineup.

In the summer of 1985 Chuck Schuldiner, of pioneering death metal act Death, invited Carlson and Olivo to Florida to complete the Death lineup. The two parties failed to settle on a uniform creative direction and the merger proved short lived. Carlson and Olivo returned to Flint that summer, determined to reform Genocide. Local punk Dave 'Grave' Hollingshead was recruited as drummer, after Carlson and Olivo saw an article about Hollingshead being arrested for grave robbery.

In 1985 the reformed Genocide recorded the Violent Death demo tape, with Carlson assuming bass duties, and resumed playing live locally. In late 1985 Aaron Freeman was invited into the band as a second guitarist. With their line-up fleshed out, Genocide recorded in a studio for the first time to lay down the tracks for what was supposed to be their first album The Stench of Burning Death – it ended up being their third demo. By 1986 Repulsion's trademark style had matured; characterised by raspy shouted vocals, extremely distorted down-tuned guitars, overdriven punkish riffs, absurd rambling solos interjected as if only as an afterthought, rumbling bass lines, and machine-gun drumming. Repulsion was experimenting with a hammering, static clouded, lo-fi sound that was on a level of extreme that had been touched on by few bands before. To complement the band's sound they penned gruesome lyrics; focusing on fantastic apocalyptic themes ranging from zombie epidemics to nuclear war.

Finally in 1989 Repulsion's material enjoyed modest, albeit posthumous, exposure when UK grindcore pioneers Carcass distributed a Repulsion compilation titled Horrified on their own Necrosis Records label; a subsidiary of Earache Records. With interest in Repulsion rekindled, the band decided to reform in 1990. They resumed playing live with the (almost) 'classic' Repulsion lineup: Scott Carlson bass and vocals, Aaron Freeman on guitar, and Dave Grave on drums; Matt Olivo, then serving in the army, filled in as a second guitarist when possible. Repulsion recorded two self-financed demos in 1991: Rebirth, and their Final Demo, often criticised as lacking the drive and intensity of the band's earlier material. Later that year they managed to release a single on Relapse entitled Excruciation. In spite of new material the band broke up yet again in 1993. Scott Carlson went on to play in Cathedral briefly, the rest of the band departed for short-lived projects or simply returned to everyday life. Relapse re-released Horrified again in 2003, drawing attention to Repulsion once more, and prompting the band to resume live performance.

In 2008, Repulsion opened for At the Gates on their "Suicidal Final Tour" in California, along with Darkest Hour and Municipal Waste.

Venom, Hellhammer, Celtic Frost, Discharge, Possessed, N.Y.C. Mayhem, Slayer, Slaughter, Exodus, and Crucifix have been repeatedly cited in interviews as major influences. Various bands have recorded covers of Repulsion songs, including Napalm Death, Impaled and Entombed.

Members

Current
Source:
Scott Carlson - vocals (1984-1985, 1985–1988, 1990-1993, 2003–present), bass (1985–1988, 1990-1993, 2003–present)
Matt Olivo - guitar (1984-1985, 1985–1988, 1990-1993, 2003–present)
Chris Moore - drums (2014–present)

Former
James Auten - drums (1984)
Sean MacDonald - bass (1985)
Phill Hines - drums (1984)
Aaron Freeman - guitar (1986-1988, 1990-1993, 2003–2005)
Dave 'Grave' Hollingshead - drums (1986-1988, 1990-1993, 2003–2005)
Col Jones - drums (2005-2014)
Tom 'Fish' Perro - drums (1986)
Matt Harvey - guitar (2005-2008)
Mike Beams - guitar (2008-2011)
Marissa Martinez - guitar (2011-2013)

Timeline

Discography

Demos
 Rehearsal Tape (1984)
 Stench of Burning Death (1984)
 Violent Death (1985)
 WFBE (1986)
 Slaughter of the Innocent (1986)
 Rebirth (1991)
 Final Demo (1991)

Single
 "Excruciation" (Relapse Records, 1991)

Album
 Horrified (Necrosis Records, 1989; Relapse Records, 1992, 2003; Southern Lord Records, 2006)

Split
 Relapse Singles Series Vol. 3 (Relapse Records, 2004)

References

External links
Official Repulsion MySpace page
Interview with Scott Carlson and Matt Olivo

American grindcore musical groups
Hardcore punk groups from Michigan
Earache Records artists
Musical groups established in 1984
Musical groups disestablished in 1988
Musical groups reestablished in 1990
Musical groups disestablished in 1993
Musical groups reestablished in 2003
Musical groups from Flint, Michigan